Adam Frederick Falk is the President of the Alfred P. Sloan Foundation. Earlier in his career, Falk was the President of Williams College, a university administrator at Johns Hopkins University, and a theoretical physicist.

Early life
Falk is a native of Chapel Hill, North Carolina. He graduated from  the North Carolina School of Science and Mathematics after attending Durham Academy. He received a B.S. from the University of North Carolina at Chapel Hill in 1987, where he was a Morehead-Cain Scholar.

He received a Ph.D in physics from Harvard University in 1991.

Career
Falk began his career as a post-doctoral researcher working first at the Stanford Linear Accelerator Center and then at the University of California, San Diego. In 1994, he joined the physics faculty at Johns Hopkins University, becoming a full professor in 2000.

In 2006, Falk became the James B. Knapp Dean at the Zanvyl Krieger School of Arts and Sciences at Johns Hopkins University.

From 2010 to 2017, Falk served as the 17th President of Williams College.

Since the beginning of 2018, Falk has served as President of the Alfred P. Sloan Foundation.

Research
Falk is a high-energy physicist whose research focused on elementary particle physics and quantum field theory, particularly in interactions and decay of meson and baryons containing heavy quarks. He is the author of more than 50 peer-reviewed papers on these and related topics.

Honors and awards
Fellow of the American Physical Society, 2002 
Johns Hopkins Alumni Association Excellence in Teaching Award
Young Investigator Award, NSF 
Sloan Research Fellowship
Morehead-Cain Scholar, University of North Carolina

References

External links
Office of the President webpage at Williams

1965 births
Living people
North Carolina School of Science and Mathematics alumni
University of North Carolina at Chapel Hill alumni
Harvard Graduate School of Arts and Sciences alumni
Williams College faculty
Presidents of Williams College
21st-century American physicists
Fellows of the American Physical Society